The Lac des Vents volcanic complex is a  thick Archean volcanic complex in the Abitibi greenstone belt of Quebec, Canada. It is an important part of a major submarine volcanic structure.

See also
Volcanism in Canada
List of volcanoes in Canada

References

Volcanoes of Quebec
Archean volcanoes
Landforms of Abitibi-Témiscamingue